The National Hockey League's Pacific Division was formed in 1993 as part of the Western Conference in a league realignment. It is also one of the two successors of the Smythe Division (the other one was the Northwest Division), though of the current teams, only the Anaheim Ducks, Seattle Kraken and Vegas Golden Knights did not play in the Smythe Division. Due to subsequent realignments, three of the Pacific Division's original teams (the Calgary Flames, Edmonton Oilers, and Vancouver Canucks) left the division in 1998 but returned in 2013. The division is the only one in the NHL without any Original Six teams. Due to the COVID-19 pandemic and the resulting closure of the Canada-United States border, all eight teams were transferred into two different divisions for the 2020–21 NHL season. The American-based teams were moved to the West Division, while the Canadian-based teams were placed into the North Division.

With the addition of the expansion Seattle Kraken to the division in the 2021–22 NHL season and the NHL becoming a 32 team league, the Coyotes were moved to the Central Division to balance out the divisional alignment of eight teams per division.

Division lineups

1993–1995
 Mighty Ducks of Anaheim
 Calgary Flames
 Edmonton Oilers
 Los Angeles Kings
 San Jose Sharks
 Vancouver Canucks

Changes from the 1992–93 season
 The Pacific Division is formed as a result of NHL realignment
 The Calgary Flames, Edmonton Oilers, Los Angeles Kings, San Jose Sharks, and Vancouver Canucks come from the Smythe Division
 The Mighty Ducks of Anaheim are added as an expansion team

1995–1998
 Mighty Ducks of Anaheim
 Calgary Flames
 Colorado Avalanche
 Edmonton Oilers
 Los Angeles Kings
 San Jose Sharks
 Vancouver Canucks

Changes from the 1994–95 season
 The Quebec Nordiques relocate to Denver, Colorado, and become the Colorado Avalanche
 The Colorado Avalanche come from the Northeast Division

1998–2006
 Mighty Ducks of Anaheim
 Dallas Stars
 Los Angeles Kings
 Phoenix Coyotes
 San Jose Sharks

Changes from the 1997–98 season
 The Calgary Flames, Colorado Avalanche, Edmonton Oilers, and Vancouver Canucks move to the Northwest Division
 The Dallas Stars and Phoenix Coyotes come from the Central Division

2006–2013
 Anaheim Ducks
 Dallas Stars
 Los Angeles Kings
 Phoenix Coyotes
 San Jose Sharks

Changes from the 2005–06 season
 The Mighty Ducks of Anaheim changed their name to the Anaheim Ducks

2013–2014
 Anaheim Ducks
 Calgary Flames
 Edmonton Oilers
 Los Angeles Kings
 Phoenix Coyotes
 San Jose Sharks
 Vancouver Canucks

Changes from the 2012–13 season
 The Northwest Division is dissolved due to NHL realignment 
 The Dallas Stars move to the Central Division
 The Calgary Flames, Edmonton Oilers, and Vancouver Canucks come from the Northwest Division

2014–2017
 Anaheim Ducks
 Arizona Coyotes
 Calgary Flames
 Edmonton Oilers
 Los Angeles Kings
 San Jose Sharks
 Vancouver Canucks

Changes from the 2013–14 season
 The Phoenix Coyotes changed their name to the Arizona Coyotes

2017–2020
 Anaheim Ducks
 Arizona Coyotes
 Calgary Flames
 Edmonton Oilers
 Los Angeles Kings
 San Jose Sharks
 Vancouver Canucks
 Vegas Golden Knights

Changes from the 2016–17 season
 The Vegas Golden Knights are added as an expansion team

2020–2021
 Division not used for the 2020–21 NHL season

Changes from the 2019–20 season
 Due to COVID-19 restrictions the NHL realigned into four divisions with no conferences for the 2020–21 season
 The Anaheim Ducks, Arizona Coyotes, Los Angeles Kings, San Jose Sharks and Vegas Golden Knights move to the West Division
 The Calgary Flames, Edmonton Oilers and Vancouver Canucks move to the North Division

2021–present
 Anaheim Ducks
 Calgary Flames
 Edmonton Oilers
 Los Angeles Kings
 San Jose Sharks
 Seattle Kraken
 Vancouver Canucks
 Vegas Golden Knights

Changes from the 2020–21 season
 The league returned to using a four division and two conference alignment
 The Anaheim Ducks, Los Angeles Kings, San Jose Sharks and Vegas Golden Knights come from the West Division
 The Calgary Flames, Edmonton Oilers and Vancouver Canucks come from the North Division
 The Seattle Kraken are added as an expansion team

Division champions
 1994 – Calgary Flames (42–29–13, 97 pts)
 1995 – Calgary Flames (24–17–7, 55 pts)
 1996 – Colorado Avalanche (47–25–10, 104 pts)
 1997 – Colorado Avalanche (49–24–9, 107 pts)
 1998 – Colorado Avalanche (39–26–17, 95 pts)
 1999 – Dallas Stars (51–19–12, 114 pts)
 2000 – Dallas Stars (43–23–10–6, 102 pts)
 2001 – Dallas Stars (48–24–8–2, 106 pts)
 2002 – San Jose Sharks (44–27–8–3, 99 pts)
 2003 – Dallas Stars (46–17–15–4, 111 pts)
 2004 – San Jose Sharks (43–21–12–6, 104 pts)
 2005 – no season (NHL Lockout)
 2006 – Dallas Stars (53–23–6, 112 pts)
 2007 – Anaheim Ducks (48–20–14, 110 pts)
 2008 – San Jose Sharks (49–23–10, 108 pts)
 2009 – San Jose Sharks (53–18–11, 117 pts)
 2010 – San Jose Sharks (51–20–11, 113 pts)
 2011 – San Jose Sharks (48–25–9, 105 pts)
 2012 – Phoenix Coyotes (42–27–13, 97 pts)
 2013 – Anaheim Ducks (30–12–6, 66 pts)
 2014 – Anaheim Ducks (54–20–8, 116 pts)
 2015 – Anaheim Ducks (51–24–7, 109 pts)
 2016 – Anaheim Ducks (46–25–11, 103 pts)
 2017 – Anaheim Ducks (46–23–13, 105 pts)
 2018 – Vegas Golden Knights (51–24–7, 109 pts)
 2019 – Calgary Flames (50–25–7, 107 pts)
 2020 – Vegas Golden Knights (39–24–8, 86 pts)
 2021 – Division suspended for season
 2022 – Calgary Flames (50–21–11, 111 pts)

Season results

Notes
 The 1994–95 NHL season was shortened to 48 games due to the lockout.
 The 2012–13 NHL season was shortened to 48 games due to the lockout.
 The 2019–20 NHL season was cut short due to the COVID-19 pandemic. Due to the imbalance in the number of games played among teams, the regular season standings were determined by points percentage.

Stanley Cup winners produced
 1996 – Colorado Avalanche
 1999 – Dallas Stars
 2007 – Anaheim Ducks
 2012 – Los Angeles Kings
 2014 – Los Angeles Kings

Presidents' Trophy winners produced
 1997 – Colorado Avalanche
 1999 – Dallas Stars
 2009 – San Jose Sharks

Pacific Division titles won by team
Teams in bold are currently in the division.

References

NHL History

 
 
National Hockey League divisions
Sports in the Western United States
Anaheim Ducks
Calgary Flames
Edmonton Oilers
Los Angeles Kings
San Jose Sharks
Seattle Kraken
Vancouver Canucks
Vegas Golden Knights